Lukáš Kojnok (born 30 May 1997) is a Slovak professional footballer who plays for MŠK Novohrad Lučenec as a right-back.

Club career

MFK Ružomberok
Kojnok made his Fortuna Liga debut for Ružomberok against Pohronie on 3 August 2019, in a 0:1 home defeat. He replaced Adam Brenkus as a midfielder in the game during half-time and was booked with a yellow card in the 70th minute, following a foul.

References

External links
 MFK Ružomberok official profile 
 Futbalnet profile 
 
 

1997 births
Living people
People from Lučenec
Sportspeople from the Banská Bystrica Region
Slovak footballers
Association football defenders
ŠKM Liptovský Hrádok players
MFK Ružomberok players
MFK Dukla Banská Bystrica players
Slovak Super Liga players
2. Liga (Slovakia) players
3. Liga (Slovakia) players